Daisy Hasan is an Indian-English author from Shillong, Meghalaya and is the author of The To-Let House. It was longlisted for the Man Asian Literary Prize 2008.

Biography

Daisy Hasan teaches at the University of Cardiff, Wales. She is a writer and filmmaker, interested in theatre and video films. She writes regularly for national newspapers, acts in street theatre and is currently teaching a course on Bollywood films.
She holds a PhD from Swansea University, UK. She is currently engaged in a study of South Asian women’s art in conflict situations at the University of Leeds, UK and is working on her second novel to be set in Britain.

Her book The To-Let House is also shortlisted for The Hindu Best Fiction Award in  2010

She also took part in the Bush Theatre's 2011 project Sixty Six Books where she wrote a piece based upon a book of the King James Bible
And she contributed many books to ''English language "

References

Living people
Women writers from Meghalaya
English-language writers from India
British writers of Indian descent
People from Shillong
21st-century Indian novelists
21st-century English women writers
Women writers of Indian descent
21st-century Indian women writers
Novelists from Meghalaya
Year of birth missing (living people)
Alumni of Swansea University